The spotted elachura or spotted wren-babbler (Elachura formosa) is a species of passerine bird found in the forests of the eastern Himalayas and Southeast Asia. In the past it was included in the babbler genus Spelaeornis as S. formosus, but molecular phylogenetic studies in 2014 provided evidence that it was distinct from the babblers and part of a basal lineage (one that diverged early) with no other close living relatives within the passerine bird clade Passerida. This led to the creation of a new family, Elachuridae, to accommodate just one species (a monotypic taxon).

Description
The spotted elachura measures 10 cm including its short tail. It is dark brown all over, with rufous wings and tail. It also has white speckles all over its body, shifting to black barring on its wings and tail.

Habitat and distribution
It is found in Bangladesh, Bhutan, China, India, Laos, Myanmar, Nepal, and Vietnam. Its natural habitat is subtropical or tropical moist montane forests. This species is found in undergrowth and dense thickets of this type of forest, with a preference for thick fern ground cover, mossy rocks and decaying trunks of fallen trees and brushwood (often near a stream or creek), long grass, and scrub.

References

External links
ScienceShot: Asian Bird Is a True Loner
What's old is new again: newly discovered songbird family is ancient

spotted elachura
Birds of Bhutan
Birds of Northeast India
Birds of South China
Birds of Laos
Birds of Myanmar
Birds of Vietnam
Birds of Yunnan
spotted elachura
Taxonomy articles created by Polbot